The Honduras leaf-toed gecko (Phyllodactylus palmeus) is a species of gecko. It is endemic to the Bay Islands in Honduras.

References

Phyllodactylus
Reptiles described in 1968